The Declaration of the Independence of New Zealand, signed by a number of Māori chiefs in 1835, proclaimed the sovereign independence of New Zealand prior to the signing of the Treaty of Waitangi in 1840.

Background 

In 1834, the document was drafted by 34 northern Māori chiefs – including Tāmati Wāka Nene, Tītore and Bay of Islands brothers; Te Wharerahi, Rewa and Moka Te Kainga-mataa – together with James Busby, the official British Resident in New Zealand. The document was initially signed at Waitangi on 28 October 1835. By 1839, 52 chiefs had signed.

In the process of signing, the chiefs established themselves as representing a confederation under the title of the "United Tribes of New Zealand". Missionaries Henry Williams and George Clarke translated the declaration and signed as witnesses. Merchants James Clendon and Gilbert Mair also signed as witnesses.

The declaration arose in response to concerns over the lawlessness of British subjects in New Zealand and in response to a fear that France would declare sovereignty over the islands. A Frenchman, Charles de Thierry, who titled himself 'Charles, Baron de Tierry, Sovereign Chief of New Zealand and King of Nuku Hiva' (in the Marquesas Islands), sought to establish a colony on a  plot of land that he claimed to have purchased in the Hokianga.

The document also arose from movements in Māori society. From 1816 onwards, a number of Northern Māori chiefs had made visits to the colonies in New South Wales and Norfolk Island and to England, which led to discussions about unifying the tribes and the formation of a Māori government. The Māori had become involved in international trade and owned trading ships. In 1834, the chiefs selected a flag now known as the flag of the United Tribes of New Zealand for use on ships originating from New Zealand.

The need for a flag of New Zealand first became clear when the merchant ship the Sir George Murray, built in the Hokianga, was seized by customs officials in the port of Sydney. The ship had been sailing without a flag, a violation of British navigation laws. New Zealand was then not a colony and had no flag. The ship's detainment reportedly aroused indignation among the Māori population. Unless a flag was selected, ships would continue to be seized.

The flag, amended slightly when officially gazetted, became the first distinctive flag of New Zealand. As late as 1900, it was still being used to depict New Zealand, and it appeared on the South African War Medal that was issued to New Zealand soldiers of the Second Boer War and was inscribed with the phrase "Success to New Zealand Contingent 1899–1900". The unamended version of the flag, with eight-pointed stars and black fimbriation, is still widely used by Māori groups.

The declaration is displayed at the National Library of New Zealand, as part of the He Tohu exhibition, along with the Treaty of Waitangi and the 1893 Women's Suffrage Petition.

Text 
The hereditary chiefs and heads of the tribes of the northern parts of New Zealand declared the constitution of an independent state. They agreed to meet in Waitangi each year to frame laws and invited the southern tribes of New Zealand to "lay aside their private animosities" and join them.

The original English text, as was drafted by James Busby and sent to the New South Wales government and the Colonial Office in Britain is as follows:

Explanation of Māori text
The Māori text of the declaration was made by the tino rangatira (hereditary chiefs) of the northern part of New Zealand, uses the term Rangatiratanga to mean independence and declares the country a whenua Rangatira (independent state) that is to be known as the United Tribes of New Zealand.

The translation of the second paragraph is "that all sovereign power and authority in the land" ("Ko te Kingitanga ko te mana i te wenua") should "reside entirely and exclusively in the hereditary chiefs and heads of tribes in their collective capacity", expressed as the United Tribes of New Zealand.

Impact
The signatories sent a copy of the document to King William IV (who reigned from 1830 to 1837), asking him to act as the protector of the new state. The King had acknowledged the flag of the United Tribes of New Zealand and now recognised the declaration in a letter from Lord Glenelg (British Secretary of State for War and the Colonies), following consideration of the declaration by the House of Lords, dated 25 May 1836.

It read, in part:

The declaration was not well received by the Colonial Office, and it was decided that a new policy for New Zealand was needed as a corrective.

It is notable that the Treaty of Waitangi was made between the British Crown and "the chiefs of the United Tribes of New Zealand" in recognition of their independent sovereignty.

Legal effects 
Pākehā writers have dismissed the significance of He Whakaputanga as an attempt by James Busby to establish a 'settled form of government', but Māori unity movements looked to the document as the basis for Māori claims to self-determination that reaffirmed tikanga Māori and Māori concepts of power and decision-making. In 2010 the Ngāpuhi iwi (tribe) in Northland requested that the Waitangi Tribunal rule on whether the tribe had in fact relinquished sovereignty in 1840 when they signed the treaty.

Ngāpuhi Waitangi Tribunal claim (Te Paparahi o te Raki inquiry) 
In 2010, the Waitangi Tribunal began hearing Ngāpuhi's claim that sovereignty was not ceded in their signing of the Treaty of Waitangi. The Tribunal, in their Te Paparahi o te Raki inquiry (Wai 1040) is in the process of considering the Māori and Crown understandings of the declaration and the treaty. That aspect of the inquiry raises issues as to the nature of sovereignty and whether the Māori signatories to the Treaty of Waitangi intended to transfer sovereignty.

The first stage of the report was released in November 2014, and found that Māori chiefs never agreed to give up their sovereignty when they signed the Treaty of Waitangi in 1840. Tribunal manager Julie Tangaere said at the report's release to the Ngapuhi claimants:

Final submissions were received in May 2018, but the second stage of the report was still in the process of being written up .

See also
 Independence of New Zealand

Notes

References

Further reading

External links

 A declaration: He Whakaputanga, information about the declaration on the website for He Tohu, the National Library's permanent exhibition of constitutional documents
 More information on the declaration on the Archives New Zealand website
 Text and images of the declaration at NZ History
 Biography of chief Moka Te Kainga-mataa, signatory to the declaration

New Zealand
Constitution of New Zealand
Treaty of Waitangi
1835 in New Zealand
Political history of New Zealand
October 1835 events